John Balfour  (1820 – 21 March 1875) was a Station owner and Member of the Queensland Legislative Council.

Early life
John Balfour was born in Edinburgh, Scotland in 1820 to Melville Balfour and his wife Joanna (née Brunton) and was the uncle of Robert Louis Stevenson. He arrived in Queensland around 1846 and, along with his brother, became Lessees of Colinton Station, Moreton. From 1849 till 1862 he was Lessee of Cumkillenbar Station, Darling Downs, and Columba Station, Leichhardt.

Politics
Balfour was appointed to the Queensland Legislative Council on 1 May 1860 and resigned his seat in 1864.

Later life
Retiring to his home in Cleveland in 1865, he returned home to Scotland around 1872.
Balfour died 21 March 1875.

References

Members of the Queensland Legislative Council
1820 births
1875 deaths
Politicians from Edinburgh
People from Redland City
19th-century Australian politicians
Pre-Separation Queensland